Glufosinate (also known as phosphinothricin and often sold as an ammonium salt) is a naturally occurring broad-spectrum herbicide produced by several species of Streptomyces soil bacteria. Glufosinate is a non-selective, contact herbicide, with some systemic action. Plants may also metabolize bialaphos and phosalacine, other naturally occurring herbicides, directly into glufosinate. The compound irreversibly inhibits glutamine synthetase, an enzyme necessary for the production of glutamine and for ammonia detoxification, giving it antibacterial, antifungal and herbicidal properties. Application of glufosinate to plants leads to reduced glutamine and elevated ammonia levels in tissues, halting photosynthesis and resulting in plant death.

Discovery
In the 1960s and early 1970s, scientists at University of Tübingen and at the Meiji Seika Kaisha Company independently discovered that species of Streptomyces bacteria produce a tripeptide they called bialaphos that inhibits bacteria; it consists of two alanine residues and a unique amino acid that is an analog of glutamate that they named "phosphinothricin".  They determined that phosphinothricin irreversibly inhibits glutamine synthetase.  Phosphinothricin was first synthesized by scientists at Hoechst in the 1970s as a racemic mixture; this racemic mixture is called glufosinate and is the commercially relevant version of the chemical.

In the late 1980s scientists discovered enzymes in these Streptomyces species that selectively inactivate free phosphinothricin; the gene encoding the enzyme that was isolated from Streptomyces hygroscopicus was called the "bialaphos resistance" or "bar" gene, and the gene encoding the enzyme in Streptomyces viridochromogenes was called "phosphinothricin acetyltransferase" or "pat".  The two genes and their proteins have 80% homology on the DNA level and 86% amino acid homology, and are each 158 amino acids long.

Use
Glufosinate is a broad-spectrum herbicide that is used to control important weeds such as morning glories, hemp sesbania (Sesbania bispinosa), Pennsylvania smartweed (Polygonum pensylvanicum) and yellow nutsedge similar to glyphosate. It is applied to young plants during early development for full effectiveness.   It is sold in formulations under brands including Basta, Rely, Finale, Challenge and Liberty.

Glufosinate is typically used in three situations as an herbicide:
directed sprays for weed control, including in genetically modified crops
use as a crop desiccation to facilitate harvesting

Glufosinate also has shown to provide some protection against various plant diseases, as it also acts to kill fungi and bacteria on contact.

Genetically modified crops
Genetically modified crops resistant to glufosinate were created by genetically engineering the bar or pat genes from streptomyces into the relevant crop seeds. In 1995 the first glufosinate-resistant crop, canola, was brought to market, and it was followed by corn  in 1997,  cotton in 2004, and soybeans in 2011.

Mode of action
Phosphinothricin is a glutamine synthetase inhibitor that binds to the glutamate site. Glufosinate-treated plants die due to a buildup of ammonia in the thylakoid lumen, leading to the uncoupling of photophosphorylation.  The uncoupling of photophosphorylation causes the production of reactive oxygen species, lipid peroxidation, and membrane destruction.

Elevated levels of ammonia are detectable within one hour after application of phosphinothricin.

Toxicity

Exposure to humans in foods
As glufosinate is often used as a pre-harvest desiccant, residues can also be found in foods that humans ingest. Such foods include potatoes, peas, beans, corn, wheat, and barley. In addition, the chemical can be passed to humans through animals who are fed contaminated straw. Flour processed from wheat grain that contained traces of glufosinate was found to retain 10-100% of the chemicals' residues.

The herbicide is also persistent; it has been found to be prevalent in spinach, radishes, wheat and carrots that were planted 120 days after the treatment of the herbicide. Its persistent nature can also be observed by its half-life which varies from 3 to 70 days depending on the soil type and organic matter content. Residues can remain in frozen food for up to two years and the chemical is not easily destroyed by cooking the food item in boiling water. The EPA classifies the chemical as 'persistent' and 'mobile' based on its lack of degradation and ease of transport through soil.
A study revealed the presence of circulating PAGMF in women with and without pregnancy, paving the way for a new field in reproductive toxicology including nutrition and utero-placental toxicities

Exposure limits
There are no exposure limits established by the Occupational Safety & Health Administration or the American Conference of Governmental Industrial Hygienists. The WHO/FAO recommended acceptable daily intake (ADI) for glufosinate is 0.02 mg/kg. The European Food Safety Authority has set an ADI of 0.021 mg/kg. The Acute reference dose (ARfD) for child-bearing women is 0.021 mg/kg.

Regulation
Glufosinate is a United States Environmental Protection Agency EPA registered chemical. It is also a California registered chemical. It is not banned in the country and it is not a PIC pesticide. There are no exposure limits established by OSHA or the American Conference of Governmental Industrial Hygienists.

Glufosinate is registered for use as an herbicide in Europe; it was last reviewed in 2007 and that registration was set to expire in 2018. It has been withdrawn from the French market since October 24, 2017 by the Agence nationale de sécurité sanitaire de l'alimentation, de l'environnement et du travail due to its classification as a possible reprotoxic chemical (R1b).

References

External links
 BASF's site of LibertyLink crops
 
 
 
 

Herbicides
Phosphinic acids
Ammonium compounds
Amino acids
Glutamine synthetase inhibitors
Eukaryotic selection compounds